Sękocin Las  is a village in the administrative district of Gmina Raszyn, within Pruszków County, Masovian Voivodeship, in east-central Poland.

References

Villages in Pruszków County